Carrying Place can refer to:

 Carrying Place, Ontario, a community and National Historic Site in Canada
 Carrying Place and Carrying Place Town, townships in Northwest Somerset, Maine, USA
 Oneida Carrying Place, Rome, New York, USA
 Toronto Carrying-Place Trail
 Portage or carrying trail, place where watercraft or cargo are carried over land from one body of water to another